Ramil (Cyrillic: Рамиль) is an Asian masculine given name and an occasional surname. It may refer to

Given name
Ray Arcel (born Ramil Arcel; 1899–1994), American boxing trainer 
Ramil Aritkulov (born 1978), Russian middle-distance runner 
Ramil Gallego (born 1966), Filipino pool player
Ramil Ganiyev (born 1968), Uzbekistani decathlete 
Ramil Gasimov (born 1981), Azerbaijani paralympic judoka
Ramil Guliyev (born 1990), Azerbaijani-Turkish sprinter 
Ramil Hasanov (born 1996), Ukrainian football striker 
Ramil Kharisov (born 1977), Russian football player
Ramil Khayrulin (born 1985), Russian film producer, filmmaker and screenwriter
Ramil Rodriguez (1944–2014), Filipino actor 
Ramil Safarov (born 1977), Azerbaijani military officer
Ramil Sarkulov (born 1981), Uzbekistani ice dancer
Ramil Sheriff (born 1993), Jamaican football midfielder 
Ramil Sheydayev (born 1996), Russian-Azerbaijani footballer 
Ramil Usubov (born 1948), Minister of Internal Affairs of Azerbaijan
Ramil Valeyev (born 1973), Russian football coach and former player
Ramil Yuldashev (born 1961), Ukrainian ice hockey winger 
Ramil Zaripov (born 1992), Russian football defender

Surname
Kleiton & Kledir (brothers Kleiton Ramil and Kledir Ramil), Brazilian singers and songwriters
Manuel Ramil (born 1978), Spanish keyboardist for the Power metal band WarCry
Mario R. Ramil (1946–2017), Associate Justice of the Hawaii State Supreme Court 
Vitor Ramil (born 1962), Brazilian musician, singer, composer and writer

See also
Typhoon Ramil in the Western Pacific